Isabella is a 2006 Hong Kong film directed by Pang Ho-Cheung and starring Chapman To, Isabella Leong and Anthony Wong. It played in competition at the 56th annual Berlin International Film Festival, where it won the Silver Bear for best film music (it was nominated for the Golden Bear as well). The film is set in Macau.

Plot 

On the eve of the Portuguese handover of Macau, a crooked cop, Shin (To), meets the daughter he didn't know he had, Yan (Leong).

Cast 

Chapman To
Isabella Leong
Anthony Wong
Josie Ho
Jim Chim
Steven Cheung
Shawn Yue
Wan Yeung-ming

Awards
Silver Bear, Film Music – 2006 Berlin International Film Festival 
Golden Bear, Best Film – 2006 Berlin International Film Festival (Nominated)
Best original film score of 26th Hong Kong Film Awards

See also
 List of Hong Kong films
 List of films set in Macau

References

External links 

 

2006 films
Triad films
2000s Cantonese-language films
Media Asia films
Films set in Macau
Films directed by Pang Ho-cheung
2000s Hong Kong films